State Route 91 (SR 91) is a major east–west state highway in the U.S. state of California that serves several regions of the Greater Los Angeles urban area. A freeway throughout its entire length, it officially runs from Vermont Avenue in Gardena, just west of the junction with the Harbor Freeway (Interstate 110, I-110), east to Riverside at the junction with the Pomona (SR 60 west of SR 91) and Moreno Valley (SR 60 and I-215 east of SR 91) freeways.

Though signs along the portion from Vermont Avenue west to Pacific Coast Highway (SR 1) in Hermosa Beach along Artesia Boulevard are still signed as SR 91, the California Department of Transportation (Caltrans) no longer controls this portion of the highway, as this segment was relinquished to local jurisdictions in 2003.

SR 91 inherited its route number from the mostly decommissioned U.S. Route 91 (US 91), which passed through the Inland Empire in a northeasterly direction on its way to Las Vegas, Salt Lake City, and points beyond. Those segments of US 91 are now parallel to, or have been replaced altogether by, I-15.

Route description
From the Harbor Freeway (I-110) to its interchange with the Long Beach Freeway (I-710) in northern Long Beach, SR 91 is named the Gardena Freeway. Between the Long Beach Freeway and its interchange with the Santa Ana Freeway (I-5) in Buena Park, it is named the Artesia Freeway. From the Santa Ana Freeway to its eastern terminus at the interchange of the Pomona, Moreno Valley, and Escondido Freeways, it is named the Riverside Freeway.

Control cities on the route vary by location. Heading westbound, between SR 60/I-215 and the Orange County line, the control city is Beach Cities. With SR 241 heading towards Irvine, Laguna Beach, and the rest of south Orange County, the control city becomes Los Angeles between the Orange–Riverside county line and I-5. I-5 directs travelers to Los Angeles so between I-5 and Pioneer Boulevard, the control city is Artesia. Between Pioneer Boulevard and SR 1, the control city becomes Beach Cities again besides Carmenita Road in Cerritos, the control city is in Long Beach. Heading eastbound, the control city for the entire route is Riverside. The Beach Cities control city may have to do with SR 91's former western terminus in Hermosa Beach.

SR 91 is part of the California Freeway and Expressway System, and is part of the National Highway System, a network of highways that are considered essential to the country's economy, defense, and mobility by the Federal Highway Administration. SR 91 is part of the State Scenic Highway System from SR 55 to the east city limit of Anaheim, in the western part of the Santa Ana Canyon, and is eligible for the system through the canyon to Interstate 15.

Gardena Freeway
The Gardena Freeway is a freeway in southern Los Angeles County. It is the westernmost freeway portion of State Route 91. It begins just west of the Harbor Freeway at the intersection with Vermont Avenue in the eastern edge of the city of Gardena, proceeding eastward approximately six miles (10 km) until it intersects the Long Beach Freeway. Thereafter, SR 91 is known as the Artesia Freeway.

Until 1991, the Gardena Freeway was known as the Redondo Beach Freeway. The name change reflected the successful efforts of the cities of Torrance and Redondo Beach to block the extension of the freeway westward to its intended terminus at the cancelled Pacific Coast Freeway in Redondo Beach. In 1997, the California government dedicated the portion of SR 91 between Alameda Street and Central Avenue to former assemblyman Willard H. Murray Jr.

Artesia Freeway
The Artesia Freeway is a freeway in southeastern Los Angeles County and northwestern Orange County. It runs east–west from its western terminus at the Long Beach Freeway in northern Long Beach to its eastern terminus at the Santa Ana Freeway in Buena Park. (SR 91 continues west of the Long Beach Freeway as the Gardena Freeway, and east of the Santa Ana Freeway as the Riverside Freeway.) The "Artesia Freeway" name originally was assigned to the entire length of SR 91 west of the Santa Ana Freeway in the early 1970s since it was, in sense, the freeway realignment of SR 91 from the paralleling Artesia Boulevard.

During the 1984 Summer Olympics, a  stretch of the highway was home to the cycling men's road team time trial event.

As the only freeway to link Los Angeles, Orange, and Riverside counties, SR 91 is one of the most heavily congested routes in Southern California.

Riverside Freeway

Between the Santa Ana Freeway, Interstate 5 (I-5), in Buena Park and the 91 Freeway's eastern terminus at a junction with Interstate 215 and State Route 60 in Riverside, the 91 Freeway's assigned name is the Riverside Freeway. Past the I-215/SR 60/SR 91 junction, the Riverside Freeway continues as I-215.

The freeway through the Santa Ana Canyon is paralleled by the 91/Perris Valley Line of Metrolink. Named after SR 91, the line also connects Los Angeles to Orange and Riverside counties.

A weigh station is available between the Imperial Highway and Yorba Linda Boulevard/Weir Canyon Road exits.

In 2003, Caltrans permanently closed off the Coal Canyon Road westbound and eastbound exits and entrances for environmental purposes; however, there are still traces of unmaintained road where the former exit lay, showing evidence that the ramps still exist, available to use as runaway ramps or emergency stops. In 2015, Caltrans permanently closed off the Grand Boulevard eastbound exit and westbound entrance to accommodate the widening of the freeway. If the ramps had stayed open, more businesses and houses would have been demolished. The ramps were scrapped with the widening and there is no emergency exit.

The Riverside Freeway first opened in 1963 signed as U.S. Route 91 and U.S. Route 395 and the last section was built in 1975.

91 Express Lanes
The 91 Express Lanes run from the junction of SR 91 with the SR 55 Freeway (Costa Mesa Freeway) in Anaheim to its junction with I-15 in Corona. Before the extension in 2017, they ended at the Riverside County line. With the extension of the toll lanes, the HOV lane between I-15 and Green River Road was converted into a HOT lane. The primary purpose of the toll lanes is to provide a faster output for drivers due to the congestion the highway experiences during peak hours, and to promote carpooling. The toll lanes opened in 1995 and when they opened, it was the country's first fully-automated toll collection system to feature value pricing.

The 91 Express Lanes consist of two primary lanes in each direction, separated from the main lanes of the Riverside Freeway with white, plastic lane markers (as opposed to concrete barriers or a similar solid barrier, or even just double white lines separating many other California HOT lanes). Entry and exit points for the 91 Express Lanes are only located at their west and east ends, and at the Orange–Riverside county line where the toll road originally terminated before 2017.  

All tolls are collected using an open road tolling system, and therefore there are no toll booths to receive cash. Each vehicle is required to carry a FasTrak transponder. The 91 Express Lanes use a variable pricing system based on the time of day. The road is not truly congestion priced because toll rates come from a preset schedule and are not based on actual congestion. , the highest toll rate on the tollway, charged 2:00 pm to 3:00 pm eastbound on Fridays, is $14.24 to travel the entire length ($8.60 on the Orange County segment, plus $5.65 on the Riverside County segment). The highest toll in the morning rush hour, charged 7:00 am to 7:59 am westbound Monday to Thursday, is $15.35 ($9.40 on the Riverside County segment, plus $5.95 on the Orange County segment). Carpools with three or more people are charged  50 percent of the posted toll when traveling eastbound from 4:00 pm to 6:00 pm on weekdays, and travel toll-free at all other times, if they use the designated carpool lane at the toll collection points. Drivers without any FasTrak tag will be assessed a toll violation regardless of whether they qualified for the carpool discounts.

A toll policy is published which states the criteria where tolls will be raised. The policy is designed to "a) reduce the likelihood of congestion by diverting traffic to other hours with available capacity; b) maintain free flow travel speed in the 91 Express Lanes; c) maintain travel time savings; d) accommodate projected growth in travel demand and; e) ensure that the toll road generates sufficient revenue to effectively operate the toll lanes and maintain a strong debt service position." Changes to the toll schedule require ten days notification to the public and the OCTA board. Once tolls are changed during the super peak period, they may not be changed again for six months. All tolls increase annually due to inflation. Despite this, the toll lanes are generally free flowing during most peak hour conditions.

History

Original US 91: Barstow to Nevada

The Arrowhead Trail, an auto trail connecting Salt Lake City with Los Angeles, initially took a longer route via present US 95 and former US 66 between Las Vegas and Needles, as the more direct Old Spanish Trail was in very poor condition. The "Silver Lake cutoff", which would save about 90 miles (145 km), was proposed by 1920, and completed in 1925 as an oiled road by San Bernardino County. The Bureau of Public Roads and the state of Nevada both urged its inclusion in the state highway system, the former as part of the federal aid highway connecting Salt Lake City and Los Angeles, and the state legislature did that in 1925, with it becoming an extension of Route 31. (Across the state line, State Route 6 continued through Las Vegas to Arizona.) The initial plan for the U.S. Highway system simply stated that Route No. 91 would run from Las Vegas "to an intersection with Route No. 60" (which became US 66 in 1926), but in 1926 the cutoff was chosen, ending at US 66 at Daggett, just east of Barstow. (The roadway south from Las Vegas later became part of US 95.) The route was added to the federal-aid secondary system in 1926, which helped pay for a mid-1930s widening and paving, including some realignments (parts of the old road are now known as Arrowhead Trail). The new routing generally followed the present I-15, except through Baker (where it used Baker Boulevard) and into Barstow (where it followed former SR 58 to First Avenue, ending at Main Street, which carried US 66).

SR 18: former extension of US 91 through Santa Ana Canyon to Long Beach
US 91 was extended southwest to Long Beach in the late 1940s. Beginning at Barstow, the extension overlapped US 66 over Cajon Pass to San Bernardino. From San Bernardino west through Riverside and Santa Ana Canyon to Olive, the state took over a mostly paved county highway in 1931 as part of an extension of Route 43 to Newport Beach via Santa Ana. Two branches leading west from Route 43 near Olive along mostly constructed county roads were added in 1933: Route 175 along Orangethorpe Avenue and Artesia Boulevard from near the mouth of the canyon west to Route 60 (now SR 1) in Hermosa Beach (unconstructed through Compton until the mid-1950s), and Route 178 along Lincoln Avenue and Carson Street from Olive west to Route 168 (now SR 19) in Lakewood. When state routes were marked in 1934, Route 175 became Sign Route 14, and Sign Route 18 included all of Route 178 and most of Route 43 into the San Bernardino Mountains. When US 91 was extended to Long Beach, it overlapped SR 18 from San Bernardino to Lakewood, where it turned south along SR 19 to the Los Alamitos Traffic Circle. There it turned west along US 101 Alternate to near downtown Long Beach, where it ended at SR 15 (Atlantic Avenue), at a terminus shared with US 6. (This routing along SR 19 and US 101 Alt. also became an extension of SR 18.)

In 1935, the state improved the alignment between Fairmont Boulevard and Gypsum Canyon Road, including a bypass of the old road, which curved along the south slope of the canyon, east of Weir Canyon Road. In the late 1930s, the Prado Dam project resulted in the bypassing of a longer section, replacing Prado Road, an abandoned road curving to the east end of the dam, Pomona Rincon Road, Auto Center Drive, Pomona Road, and Yorba Street with the present Green River Road, Palisades Drive, part of SR 91, and 6th Street.

SR 14: present SR 91 to Hermosa Beach
Before the present freeway was constructed, SR 14 ran along Gould Avenue, Redondo Beach Boulevard, Compton Boulevard, Alameda Street, Artesia Avenue, La Habra Boulevard, Firestone Boulevard and Orangethorpe Avenue.  In the 1964 renumbering, SR 14 was renumbered to SR 91.

Prior to 1991, the Gardena Freeway was known as the Redondo Beach Freeway, referring to Caltrans's original intention for the freeway portion of the route to continue all the way to the never-built Pacific Coast Freeway.

Before 1997, Caltrans controlled maintenance of SR 91 up to State Route 1 in Hermosa Beach. The portion between Vermont Avenue and Western Avenue was relinquished to Gardena in 1997. In 2003, the western portion, from SR 1 to Western Avenue, was relinquished to the cities that the road goes through.

The first segment of the freeway was built in 1965 as US 91, and the last segment was built in 1975. Despite the relinquishments, however, Artesia Boulevard between I-110 and SR 1 is still signed off as SR 91.

Construction of the 91 Express Lanes
Due to rapid population growth and the decline in the availability of affordable housing closer to job centers in Orange County, new residential development began in earnest in western Riverside County from the 1980s through today. This development is occurring in or around existing cities such as Riverside, Corona, Moreno Valley, Lake Elsinore, Murrieta, and Temecula. This development also led to the incorporation of the cities of Wildomar, Menifee, Eastvale, and Jurupa Valley.

As there are very few direct routes between Orange and Riverside counties because of the Santa Ana Mountains that separate them, the Riverside Freeway is subject to high traffic volumes, composed primarily of commuters traveling between their jobs in Orange County and their homes in Riverside County (often referred to by traffic reporters as "The Corona Crawl"). Typical peak period delays were 30–40 minutes in each direction in the ten miles (16 km) of the tollway before construction.

Solutions to the traffic problem were limited. The chosen solution was to create a toll road in the median of the freeway. The project was developed in partnership with the California Department of Transportation (Caltrans) by California Private Transportation Company (CPTC), which formally transferred ownership of the facility to the State of California prior to opening the project to traffic on December 27, 1995. Caltrans then leased the toll road back to CPTC for a 35-year operating period. The new lanes have been officially designated a part of the state highway system. The California Highway Patrol (CHP) is responsible for providing police services at CPTC's expense. Maintenance and operational costs for the facility are also the responsibility of CPTC.

In April 2002, the Orange County Transportation Authority (OCTA) reached an agreement in concept to purchase the private toll road project for $207.5 million. The OCTA took possession of the toll road on January 3, 2003, marking the first time the 91 Express Lanes was managed by public officials. Within a few months, OCTA turned the lanes into the HOT / tollway hybrid that it is today. One of the primary investors in CPTC, Cofiroute USA, continues to manage and operate the lanes under a management contract with OCTA.

Opening in 1995, the 91 Express Lanes was the first privately funded tollway built in the United States since the 1940s, and the first fully automated tollway in the world.

The express lanes have been controversial because of a non-compete agreement that the state made with CPTC. The clause, which was negotiated by Caltrans and never was brought to the legislature, prevented any improvements along  of the Riverside Freeway to ensure profit for the express lanes. This includes restricting the state from widening the free lanes or building mass transit near the freeway. CPTC filed a lawsuit against Caltrans over freeway widening related to the interchange with the Eastern Transportation Corridor, which was dismissed once the purchase with OCTA was finalized. Following the settlement, an additional lane was added for a  segment eastbound from SR 241 to SR 71.

However, as a result of the controversy, more toll road advocates favor creating local agencies similar to transportation corridor agencies to build and maintain future tollways. New toll roads would be financed with tax-exempt bonds on a stand-alone basis, meaning that taxpayers would not be responsible for repaying any debt if toll revenues fall short. Also, there would be a less restrictive non-compete clause: they would be compensated only for any revenue loss caused by improvements near the toll roads.

In the mid-2010s, the Riverside County Transportation Commission extended the 91 Express Lanes east from their previous terminus at the Orange–Riverside county line to the I-15 interchange in Corona; this extension opened to traffic on March 20, 2017. Both Orange and Riverside County transportation agencies co-manage the 91 Express Lanes.

Future
In 2005, evaluations were made about the feasibility of constructing two tunnels through the Santa Ana Mountains which could carry 72,000 cars per day and allow for a commuter rail service between Corona and Irvine. The financial and technical evaluations found that in the current financial environment, building the tunnels would not be financially or technologically feasible. Additional study of the Irvine Corona Expressway tunnel project has been deferred until such time as financial considerations improve and/or technological advancements warrant reexamination. If built, the Irvine-Corona Expressway would follow a similar route to the 91 Freeway and is designed to reduce the growing traffic congestion on SR 91 that prompted the construction of the 91 Express Lanes. One tunnel would be a reversible two-lane freeway for autos and trucks, the direction reversed based on time of day. It would carry westbound traffic in the morning hours, and eastbound traffic during the afternoon and early evening hours. The second tunnel would be slated exclusively for light rail commuter train service. The proposed tunnels are opposed by environmental groups, cities in Orange County near the terminus of the proposed road, and by the Irvine Company, which believes that the tunnel is not necessary and distracts from short-term solutions such as freeway widening.

Numerous other projects by the Orange County Transportation Authority are currently underway or in the planning phases for distant completion, some as far out as the year 2030.

Exit list

See also

References

External links

California @ AARoads - California 91
Caltrans: Route 91 highway conditions
California Highways: SR 91
60/91/215 Improvement Project
California Highway 91 @ Asphaltplanet.ca

091
091
State Route 091
State Route 091
State Route 091
091
Venues of the 1984 Summer Olympics
Olympic cycling venues
California State Route 091